Ali Razmara, also known as Haj Ali Razmara (30 March 1901 – 7 March 1951), was a military leader and prime minister of Iran.

He was assassinated by 26-year-old Khalil Tahmassebi of the Fadayan-e Islam organization outside the Shah Mosque in Tehran at the age of 49. Razmara was the third Iranian prime minister to be assassinated.

Early life and education
Razmara was born in Tehran in 1901. His father was a military officer. He studied at the military academy of Saint-Cyr in France.

Career

Razmara was appointed prime minister by the Shah in 1950. His cabinet was inaugurated on 26 June. He promoted a plan for decentralization of government together with decentralization of the seven-year plan for infrastructure development and improvement. His idea was to bring government to the people; an unheard-of idea in Iran. His plan called for setting up local councils in Iran's 84 districts to run local affairs such as health, education and agricultural programs. One of his most enduring achievements was the institution of the Point IV program via agreement with US President Harry Truman.

Razmara began trimming the government payrolls, eliminating a large number of officials out of a total of 187,000 civil servants. At one stroke he terminated nearly 400 high-placed officials. By so doing, Razmarra earned the wrath of the powerful land-owning and merchant families and most conservatives without gaining the confidence of the radical Tudeh Party. Additionally, his opposition to the expropriation of AIOC assets at Abadan earned him the wrath of the small but powerful group of Majlis deputies known as the National Front. The National Front was led by Majlis Member, Mohammed Mossadegh, whose leading ally in Parliament was the Assembly Speaker, Ayatollah Kashani.

Anglo-Iranian oil negotiations
Ali Razmara came closer than any other prime minister to ratifying the supplemental oil agreement between Iran and the Anglo-Iranian Oil Company (AIOC).  The agreement drew the ire of most Iranians and Majlis of Iran deputies because it provided far less favorable terms than the Venezuela agreement between Standard Oil of New Jersey and the Venezuelan government, or the agreement between the Arabian-American Oil Company and the Saudi Arabian government. In addition, it gave continuous control of Iran's oil industry to a foreign company and country; the living and working conditions of its Iranian workers were extremely poor; it refused to allow Iranians a greater voice in the company's management; and it denied them the right to audit the company's books. The AIOC did, however, offer a few improvements: it guaranteed that its annual royalty payments would not drop below 4 million pounds; it would reduce the area where it would be allowed to drill; and it promised to train more Iranians for administrative jobs. Razmara asked Anglo-Iranian to revise some of the agreement terms, namely to allow Iranian auditors to review their financial activities, offer Iranians managerial jobs, and pay some of the royalties to the Iranian government in advance.  The British refused and lost the opportunity.

Razmara was in office at the direct urging of the British Foreign Office and the AIOC to the Shah. They wanted a stronger figure than Razmara's predecessor, Prime Minister Mansur, to ensure the success of the Supplemental Agreement.  "Only a man with [Razmara's] fierce determination, they believed, would be strong enough to face down Mossadegh and the National Front."

Assassination
On 7 March 1951, Razmara went to the Shah Mosque for a memorial service. The police opened a corridor through the inner courtyard for him. The assassin, in the crowd, fired three quick shots, fatally wounding the Prime Minister. Khalil Tahmassebi, a member of the group Fadayan-e Islam, was arrested at the scene.

At a public demonstration the following day attended by more than 8,000 Tudeh Party members and National Front supporters, Fadayan-e Islam distributed leaflets carrying a threat to assassinate the Shah and other government officials if the assassin, Tahmassebi, was not set free immediately. Threats were also issued against any Majlis member who opposed oil nationalization.

The National Front was led by Mohammed Mossadegh, who became prime minister within two months of Razmara's assassination. Ayatollah Seyyed Abol-Ghasem Kashani, the leader of the country's mullahs, ended his support for the Fadayan-e Islam after the assassination. Kashani then became closer to the National Front. On the other hand, the assassin, Tahmassebi, was freed by the Iranian Parliament in 1952, but then he was tried and executed in 1955.

In 1954 Navab Safavi, founder of the Fadayan-e Islam, in a speech to the Muslim Brotherhood meeting in Egypt, declared that he himself had killed Razmara.

Effects on Iranian government

On 12 March 1951 the Majlis voted to nationalize Iran's oil. Not one Majlis member voted against the Act. A spectator in the gallery is reported to have shouted "Eight grains of gunpowder have brought this about." This was followed by a vote on 28 March to expropriate the AIOC properties at Abadan.

The Shah appointed Hussein Ala to succeed Razmara as prime minister. This move was met by further assassinations, riots, and demonstrations throughout the country. Ala ultimately resigned his post as prime minister. The Shah opted to go with former Prime Minister Sayyid Ziya al-Din Tabatabai but the Majlis, led by the National Front, voted Mohammed Mossadegh to the post.

The nationalization of the oil industry was supported by the vast majority of the Iranian public, who believed it would lead to prosperity for all. After a series of further assassinations of several more government ministers by their then ally Fadā'iyān-e Islam, Prime Minister Mossadegh and the National Front were finally able to nationalize the oil and expel the AIOC. As this move dealt a severe blow to the monarchy as well as to British interests in Iran, the US and Britain orchestrated the now well-known coup d'état in 1953, code-named Operation Ajax, removing Mossadegh as Prime Minister and convincing the Shah to appoint a Prime Minister of their choosing. Mohammad Reza Shah remained in power until the 1979 revolution, which led to the establishment of the Islamic Republic.

Personal life
Razmara married Anvar ol Molouk Hedayat who was a sister of Sadegh Hedayat, an Iranian author. They had five children.

Notes

References

 'Alí Rizā Awsatí (عليرضا اوسطى), Iran in the past three centuries (Irān dar Se Qarn-e Goz̲ashteh – ايران در سه قرن گذشته), Volumes 1 and 2 (Paktāb Publishing – انتشارات پاکتاب, Tehran, Iran, 2003).  (Vol. 1),  (Vol. 2).
 Stephen Kinzer, All The Shah's Men: An American Coup and the Roots of Middle East Terror (John Wiley & Sons, New Jersey, 2003). 
 Mary Ann Heiss, Empire and Nationhood: The United States, Great Britain, and Iranian Oil, 1950-1954 (Columbia University Press, 1997). 
 Mostafa Elm, Oil, Power, and Principle: Iran's Oil Nationalization and Its Aftermath (Syracuse: Syracuse University Press, 1994). 
 Yousof Mazandi, United Press, and Edwin Muller, Government by Assassination (Reader's Digest September 1951).

Further reading
 

1901 births
1951 deaths
École Spéciale Militaire de Saint-Cyr alumni
Prime Ministers of Iran
Iranian expatriates in France
Assassinated Iranian politicians
Deaths by firearm in Iran
People murdered in Iran
Politicians from Tehran
Assassinated heads of government
Imperial Iranian Army lieutenant generals
People assassinated by the Fada'iyan-e Islam
Victims of Islamic terrorism